Ahangari may refer to:

Ahangari, Fars
Ahangari, Khuzestan
Ahangari, Lorestan